

Yaroslavl Governorship
Governors-general

Alexey Melgunov (1777–1788)
Yevgeny Kashkin (1788–1793)
Peter Lopukhin (1794–1796)

Governors
Ivan Zaborovsky (1777–1781)
Ivan Golokhvastov (1781–1793)
Nikita Urusov (1793–1797)

Yaroslavl Governorate before the revolution
The leaders of the Yaroslavl Governorate before the revolution.

Governors
Lev Tredyakovsky (September 10, 1797 – December 11, 1797)
Nikolai Aksakov (December 11, 1797 – January 8, 1799)
Mikhail Aksakov (January 8, 1799 – November 1, 1800)
Vasily Sludin (November 2, 1800 – June 10, 1801)
Mikhail Golitsyn (June 10, 1801 – January 12, 1817)
Gabriel Politkovsky (February 1, 1817 – February 12, 1820)
Alexander Bezobrazov (February 16, 1820 – November 25, 1826)
Michael Bravin (November 25, 1826 – January 28, 1830)
Konstantin Poltoratsky (January 29, 1830 – July 17, 1842)
Anton Myasoyedov (Acting Governor: November 16, 1830 – December 9, 1830, May 14–16, 1834, July 27–29, 1841)
Irakli Baratynsky (August 30, 1842 – March 14, 1846)
Alexey Buturlin (June 1, 1846 – January 1, 1861)
Alexey Obolensky (January 8, 1861 – May 9, 1861)
Ivan Unkovsky (June 28, 1861 – March 17, 1877)
Nikolay Schmidt (April 3, 1877 – December 9, 1878)
Nikolay Bezak (December 30, 1878 – February 2, 1880)
Vladimir Levshin (February 2, 1880 – April 1, 1887)
Alexey Friede (May 21, 1887 – July 9, 1897)
Boris Stürmer (July 30, 1896 – August 10, 1902)
Alexey Rogovich (August 10, 1902 – October 18, 1905)
Alexander Rimsky-Korsakov (November 8, 1905 – May 20, 1909)
Dmitry Tatishchev (June 7, 1909 – October 20, 1915)
Sergey Evreinov (November 11, 1915 – October 16, 1916)
Nikolai Obolensky (November 1, 1916 – March 3, 1917)

Provincial leaders of the nobility
Nikolai Maikov (1805–1814)
Vladimir Filatyev (1815 – December 11, 1826)
Pavel Sokolov (December 11, 1826 – January 14, 1830)
Semyon Urusov (January 14, 1830 – December 21, 1832)
Michael Selifontov (December 21, 1832 – June 27, 1835)
Andrey Glebov (January 23, 1836 – January 22, 1842)
Alexander Glebov (January 22, 1842 – December 17, 1853)
Peter Bem (December 17, 1853 – December 16, 1859)
Nikolay Yakovlev (December 16, 1859 – October 3, 1860)
Ivan Osokin (October 3, 1860 – December 19, 1862)
Nikolay Skrynitsin (January 4, 1863 – January 24, 1878)
Victor Kalachov (February 4, 1878 – August 22, 1882)
Vasily Shakhovskoy (February 16, 1884 – February 8, 1896)
Sergey Mikhalkov (February 8, 1896 – 1905)
Ivan Kurakin (February 22, 1906 – 1915)
Gennady Kalachov (1915–1917)

Yaroslavl Governorate after the revolution
The leaders of the Yaroslavl Governorate after the revolution.

Provincial commissars
Konstantin Chernosvitov (March 5, 1917 – August 2, 1917)
Boris Duchesne (August 2, 1917 – September 28, 1917)
Urusov (1917 – December 1917)

Military leaders
Dmitry Garnovsky (November 10, 1917 – ?) – Chairman of the Military Revolutionary Committee
Kirill Babich (July 11, 1918 – September 2, 1918) – Chairman of the Provincial Revolutionary Committee
Alexander Perkhurov (July 6, 1918 – July 22, 1918) – the head of the anti-Bolshevik administration during the Yaroslavl uprising

Chairpersons of the Regional Council Executive Committee
Nikolai Dobrokhotov (November 4, 1917 – June 2, 1918)
Semyon Nakhimson (June 2, 1918 – July 6, 1918)
Vacancy (July 6, 1918 – September 1918)
Nikolai Pozharov (July 1918 – December 1918)
Peter Rayevsky (December 1918 – April 1919)
Ivan Tsvetkov (April 1919 – July 1919)
Nikolai Dobrokhotov (Acting, July 1919)
Ivan Rumyantsev (1919–1920)
Reuben Levin (1922)
Ilya Shelekhes (June 20, 1922 – February 1924)
Yakov Egorov (February 1924 – November 1924)
Vasily Korolev (November 1924 – ?)
Mikhail Boldyrev (December 1928 – 1929)

Chairs, since 1920, Responsible Secretaries of the Provincial Committee of the Bolshevik Party
Alexander Dadukin (May 1920 – January 1921)
Semyon Berg (September 1918 – February 1919)
Ivan Tsvetkov (February 1919 – April 1919)
Peter Rayevsky (April 1919 – May 1919)
Edward Lepin (May 1919 – October 1919)
Nikolay Rostopchin (October 1919 – May 1920)
Mikhail Ivanov (May 1920 – January 1921)
Vladimir Ivanov (January 1921 – July 1921)
Ivan Nevsky (June 1921 – December 1922)
Ivan Kabakov (December 1922 – February 1924)
Ilya Shelekhes (February 1924 – November 1924)
Yakov Egorov (November 1924 – April 1925)
Vasily Stroganov (April 1925 – October 1927)
Yakov Bykin (October 1927 – July 1929)

See also
Georgy Oldenburgsky – Governor-General of Tver, Yaroslavl and Novgorod

Sources
 Yaroslavl Province Handbook of the History of the Communist Party and the Soviet Union
 List of rulers of Yaroslavl
Victoria Marasanova, Fedyuk. Yaroslavl governors. 1777–1917. Yaroslavl, 1998.

Heads of Yaroslavl Governorate